Charles H. Weber (October 5, 1923 – 1989) was an American politician. He served as a Republican member for the 30th and 37th district of the Florida Senate.

Life and career 
Weber was born in Detroit, Michigan. He attended the University of Detroit, the University of Minnesota and the American University in France.

In 1967, Weber was elected to represent the 37th district of the Florida Senate, serving until 1972. In the same year, he was elected to represent the 30th district, serving until 1974.

Weber died in 1989 of cancer, at the age of 65.

References 

1923 births
1989 deaths
Politicians from Detroit
Republican Party Florida state senators
20th-century American politicians
University of Detroit Mercy alumni
University of Minnesota alumni
Deaths from cancer